Otterburn is a Palladian-influenced Greek Revival plantation house near Bedford in Bedford County, Virginia. The hilltop house was first built in 1828 for Benjamin A. McDonald (1797-1871) and his wife, the former Sally Camm of Lynchburg, and overlooks the Little Otter Creek watershed. Benjamin A. McDonald, a prominent local Whig educated in Scotland, was appointed a local justice of the peace in 1832 and won election as Bedford County's first presiding justice in 1852. Re-elected twice, he served in the county's highest office from 1852 through 1864. At its largest, the associated plantation encompassed about  acres, but in modern times includes fewer than  acres. Fire gutted the original house in 1841, and it was reconstructed in the Greek Revival style by 1843, with an unusual transverse hall plan, facade that makes the -story structure look only  stories, and the addition of a loggia, cross-gable roof with a wrought iron balustrade and Greek Revival detailing. The surviving wash house also dates to this mid-19th-century era. During the Civil War, Union soldiers reportedly confiscated flour barrels from the house, and damaged interior stairwell railings when rolling them out.
After McDonald died in 1871, since his only child, a daughter, did not survive infancy, the property passed through several owners until 1950, when the house became the Hines Memorial Pythian Home, an orphanage operated by the Knights of Pythias. A detached dormitory added at this time remains but lacks historic significance. The orphanage closed in the early 1960s. For two years in the late 1960s the Otterburn Academy used the premises, as a private school formed during Virginia's Massive Resistance to desegregation. The property later became a rest home for the elderly.  The house is being restored.

References

External links
 History of Otterburn and restoration photographs

Houses in Bedford County, Virginia
Houses completed in 1843
Greek Revival houses in Virginia
Neoclassical architecture in Virginia
Plantation houses in Virginia
Palladian Revival architecture in Virginia
Houses on the National Register of Historic Places in Virginia
National Register of Historic Places in Bedford County, Virginia
1843 establishments in Virginia
Knights of Pythias buildings